The Guernsey official football team is the official football team representing the island of Guernsey (which is not part of the United Kingdom, but is a Crown dependency) in non-FIFA international football matches. It is not affiliated with FIFA or UEFA, and therefore cannot compete for the FIFA World Cup or UEFA European Football Championship.

Men's team 
Since 1905, they have competed with Alderney and Jersey for the Muratti Vase, winning it 46 times, most recently in 2017. The players are selected from the Guernsey leagues, with the top Division being the FNB Priaulx League.

Guernsey Football went under a transformation at the start of the 2011–12 season when Guernsey F.C. was created, which led to the vast majority of the top Island players competing in the English non-league pyramid system for the very first time.

The official team is coached by Stephen Sharman who was appointed in September 2013 after Kevin Graham stepped down.

Guernsey also compete in the Island Games and are the current champions having won the gold medal in Jersey in 2015.

Managers

Competitive record 
Last game:   2–1  – The New Oval, Holyhead – 21 June 2019.
(Last update: 21 June 2019)

Island Games 

 Blue square indicates host
 dne – did not enter
1Due to Gibraltar not having enough pitches there was no football at the 2019 games. In its place the 2019 Inter Games Football Tournament were held.

Muratti Vase

Honours
Island Games: 3 
2001, 2003, 2015
Muratti Vase: 46
Wins since 2000:
2001, 2005, 2010, 2012, 2013, 2014, 2017

Men's U-16 team
Guernsey's under 16 have competed in their own Muratti Cup since 2007. In 2018, female player Maya Le Tissier made her debut for the Gurnsey team, being the first female player to play for the team, with the Gurnsey women's team being disbanded the year previous.

Honours
U-16 Muratti Cup: 2011, 2012, 2013, 2015 (shared), 2017

Women's team
The team is made up from players in the four local teams of women's football, Vale Rec, Rangers, Rovers and Sylvans. A women's team has competed annually against Jersey in the Muratti tournament since 1997. Won: 6 Drawn: 0 Lost: 13 Guernsey Women have competed in the Island Games since 2001. The best result was 4th place in 2003.

In 2016, Ormer FC was created to allow Guernsey Women to compete in UK competitions, it is affiliated to the Hampshire Football Association. This was followed by GFA announcing they would create an alternative Women's team to do something similar. These changes led to the 2017 Ladies Muratti being cancelled following disputes.

Honours
Muratti Cup: 1997, 1998, 1999, 2000, 2001, 2008

References

See also
Guernsey Football Association
Guernsey F.C.
Island Games
Football at the Island Games
Muratti

European national and official selection-teams not affiliated to FIFA
National football team
Football in Guernsey